
Year 502 (DII) was a common year starting on Tuesday (link will display the full calendar) of the Julian calendar. At the time, it was known as the Year of the Consulship of Avienus and Probus (or, less frequently, year 1255 Ab urbe condita). The denomination 502 for this year has been used since the early medieval period, when the Anno Domini calendar era became the prevalent method in Europe for naming years.

Events 
 By place 

 Byzantine Empire 
 War with Sassanid Persia: Emperor Anastasius I refuses to pay a share of the cost of defending the Caucasian Gates, through which nomadic tribes have come for raids on Persia and the Byzantine Empire. King Kavadh I invades Armenia and captures Theodosiopolis. 
 Winter – Kavadh I besieges the fortress-city of Amida (modern Turkey). The defenders, although unsupported by Byzantine troops, repel the Persian assaults for three months before they are finally beaten. 

 Europe 
 March 29 – King Gundobad issues a new legal code (Lex Burgundionum) at Lyon, that makes Gallo-Romans and Burgundians subject to the same laws (approximate date).
 The Bulgars ravage Thrace. A semi-nomadic people, they have absorbed the surviving Huns and meet no opposition from Byzantine forces.

 China 
 The Liang Dynasty is founded by Xiao Yan, who marches on Jiankang (later Nanjing). Emperor He Di, age 14, is put to death. The Southern Qi Dynasty ends and Wu Di becomes ruler of the Liang Dynasty.
 December 24 - Xiao Yan names Xiao Tong his heir designate.
 The Nanhua Temple, located southeast of Shaoguan,  is founded by the Indian monk Zhiyao Sanzang. The temple covers an area of 42,5 hectares (105 acres) and consists of a set of historical Buddhist buildings.

 By topic 
 Arts and sciences 
 The Persian philosopher Mazdak declares private property to be the source of all evil.

 Literature 
 The Chinese Book of Song is finished. The text is one of the Twenty-Four Histories, a traditional collection of historical records during the Southern and Northern Dynasties. 

 Religion 
 Caesarius becomes bishop of Arles. His episcopal see, near the mouth of the Rhone River and close to Marseille, retains its ancient importance in the social and commercial life of Gaul for forty years.  
 October 23 – The Synodus Palmaris, called by Gothic king Theodoric the Great, clears Pope Symmachus of all charges, thus ending the schism of Antipope Laurentius.

Births 
 Amalaric, king of the Visigoths (d. 531)

Deaths 
 Genevieve, patron saint of Paris (approximate date)
 He Di, Chinese emperor of Southern Qi (b. 488)
 Narsai, Syrian poet and theologian (approximate date)
 Vakhtang I of Iberia, Georgian king (approximate date)

References 

Bibliography